HASP may refer to:
Homeowners Affordability and Stability Plan, a U.S. program announced on February 18, 2009 by U.S. President Barack Obama
Houston Automatic Spooling Priority, a system program for IBM System/360 and IBM System/370 mainframe computer systems
Hasp key, a Hardware Against Software Piracy copy-protection dongle

See also 
Hasp, part of a latch